Tuuri is a village in Alavus, a town of Finland. It is located in the province of Western Finland and is part of the Southern Ostrobothnia region. The village has a population of 500. In Modern Finnish the appellative tuuri means 'luck'.

The village is known for the second biggest department store in Finland, Veljekset Keskinen. The massive golden horseshoe erected over the shopping mall stands at number three in Reuters' list of world's ugliest buildings and monuments.

See also
 Miljoona Rock

References

External links
 Official site

Villages in Finland